"Happy Birthday" is a song from American alternative rock band Concrete Blonde, which was released in 1989 as the second single from their second studio album Free. The song was written and produced by the band.

Music video
The song's music video was directed by Jane Simpson. It was shot in an apartment in Silver Lake, Los Angeles. The footage is interspersed with animated drawings.

Critical reception
On its release in the UK, Robert Sloman of the Staines & Ashford News described "Happy Birthday" as "original and hummable" and praised Concrete Blonde as "one of Los Angeles' finest rock bands". Chris Willman of the Los Angeles Times wrote, "This cheerful-sounding song, one of the year's catchiest, is really about an unhappy birthday, but Napolitano – writing about spending the night of her own 30th at home alone – is following in the great rock 'n' roll tradition of making feeling bad sound good. It's the best pop birthday song since the Beatles took a crack at it, and a little more substantive, too."

In a review of Free, Steve Hochman of the Los Angeles Times described the song as "guilelessly Beatlesque" and a song about "remembering and/or looking forward to better times". David Okamoto of the St. Petersburg Times commented, "Napolitano shows a playful sense of irony on 'Happy Birthday,' a deceivingly tuneful ditty about a poor woman who celebrates her birthday in a tenement apartment by listening to the radio and the cats in the alley." Mark Lepage of The Montreal Gazette wrote, "The music [on Free] has a particularly L.A. feel, half beauty and half grit that sticks to you in the heat, typified by 'Happy Birthday,' one of those perfect marriages of melody and rock 'n' roll consummated in just over two minutes."

Formats

Personnel
Credits are adapted from the UK CD single liner notes and the Free CD album booklet.

"Happy Birthday"
 Johnette Napolitano – vocals
 Jim Mankey – guitars
 Allan Bloch – bass
 Harry Rushakoff – drums

Production
 Concrete Blonde – producers (all tracks)
 Earle Mankey – recording (all tracks), producer ("Free")
 Chris Tsangarides – mixing (all tracks)

Other
 Anne Sperling – photography
 Johnette Napolitano – sleeve design

Charts

References

1989 songs
1989 singles
Concrete Blonde songs
Songs written by Johnette Napolitano
I.R.S. Records singles